The Four-man bobsleigh competition at the 1968 Winter Olympics in Grenoble was held on 16 February, at L'Alpe d'Huez. A sudden thaw in the ice on the track limited the competition to two runs.

Results

References

Bobsleigh at the 1968 Winter Olympics
1968 Winter Olympics events